The Libya national badminton team represents Libya in international badminton team competitions. The team is controlled by the Libyan Badminton Federation located in the capital city of Tripoli. As of now, the Libyan team have yet to compete in any international team tournament.

History 
Badminton started in Libya in the 2000s. The national team was formed in 2013 and became part of the Libyan Olympic Committee in 2014. In 2019, the Libyan Badminton Federation appointed Mohamad Dakhil Nasr as head coach of the national team. In that same year, Libya sent its first few national players to compete at the Badminton Asia Arab Regional tournament.

As of the 2020s, badminton has grew little by little in Libya. The sport continued to grow in popularity in northern regions Gharyan and Tobruk after the region hosted the first Libyan National Badminton Championships. Abdulmalik Azughdani won the men's singles title representing the Saidi Salim Badminton Club while Abdalhady Altarhuni came in second.

Clubs 
Players from the Libyan national team also compete in clubs. Currently there are a total of 8 clubs which represent 6 different cities from parts of the country.

Staff 
The following list shows the coaching staff for the Libyan national badminton team.

Players

Current squad

Men's team

Women's team

References 

Badminton
National badminton teams